Risto Darlev (born 4 August 1954) is a Yugoslav former wrestler. He competed at the 1972 Summer Olympics and the 1976 Summer Olympics.

References

External links
 

1954 births
Living people
Yugoslav male sport wrestlers
Olympic wrestlers of Yugoslavia
Wrestlers at the 1972 Summer Olympics
Wrestlers at the 1976 Summer Olympics
Place of birth missing (living people)